is a Japanese professional shogi player ranked 6-dan.

Promotion history
The promotion history for Ueno is as follows:
 6-kyū: 1991
 1-dan: 1997
 4-dan: October 1, 2000
 5-dan: April 1, 2007
 6-dan: April 1, 2019

References

External links
 ShogiHub: Ueno, Hirokazu
 Blog: ちゅう太ブログ

Japanese shogi players
Living people
Professional shogi players
Professional shogi players from Kanagawa Prefecture
1977 births